The stripeback darter (Percina notogramma) is a species of freshwater ray-finned fish, a darter from the subfamily Etheostomatinae, part of the family Percidae, which also contains the perches, ruffes and pikeperches. It is found in Chesapeake Bay tributaries in Maryland, Virginia, and West Virginia. It prefers gravel runs and riffles of small to medium-sized rivers.

References

Percina
Fish described in 1948
Taxa named by Edward Cowden Raney
Taxa named by Carl Leavitt Hubbs